Wucai (五彩, "Five colours", "Wuts'ai" in Wade-Giles) is a style of decorating white Chinese porcelain in a limited range of colours. It normally uses underglaze cobalt blue for the design outline and some parts of the images, and overglaze enamels in red, green, and yellow for the rest of the designs.  Parts of the design, and some outlines of the rest, are painted in underglaze blue, and the piece is then glazed and fired. The rest of the design is then added in the overglaze enamels of different colours and the piece fired again at a lower temperature of about 850°C to 900°C.

It has its origins in the doucai technique.  The usual distinction made with doucai, which also combines underglaze blue with overglaze enamels in other colours, is that in wucai only parts of the design include blue, and these cover wider areas, and are often rather freely painted.  In doucai the whole design is outlined in the blue, even if parts are overlaid by the enamels and invisible in the finished product.  Some parts may also be painted in the blue. However, this is not true of all pieces classified as doucai, especially from the 18th century onwards. Fragments of incomplete examples, only done in blue, have been excavated from waste tips at the kiln. 
 
The next development, Famille verte (康熙五彩, Kangxi wucai, also 素三彩, Susancai), adopted in the Kangxi period (1662–1722), uses green and iron red with other overglaze colours developed from wucai, normally without any use of underglaze blue. 

In Japan it is pronounced gosai and was initially imported. Kinrande is a form that developed out of this during the time of the Ming dynasty. 

Recently Ming underglaze Wucai was reported in the US for the first time in history

Notes

References 
 "Grove", Medley, Margaret, Oxford Art Online, section "Ming; Jingdezhen porcelains, Polychome" in "China, §VIII, 3: Ceramics: Historical development"
 Medley, Margaret, The Chinese Potter: A Practical History of Chinese Ceramics, 3rd edition, 1989, Phaidon, 
 Nillson, Jan-Eric, "Doucai Chinese porcelain decoration", in Chinese porcelain glossary, Gotheborg.com
 Pierson, Stacey, From Object to Concept: Global Consumption and the Transformation of Ming Porcelain, 2013, Hong Kong University Press, 9789888139835, google books
 "Sotheby's": the "Meiyintang Chicken Cup", Sotheby's Hong Kong, Sale HK0545 Lot: 1, 8 April 2014
 Valenstein, S. (1998). A handbook of Chinese ceramics, Metropolitan Museum of Art, New York.  (fully online)

External links 

Chinese porcelain
Types of pottery decoration